Another World is a former soap opera which aired from 1964 to 1999. Below is a list of actors who appeared on the show, along with their role(s).

Cast members

Another World